Owzthat is a dice-based cricket simulation. In its non-commercial form it is often called pencil cricket as in pre-war Britain six-sided pencils, shaved back to bare wood with the numbers and words written on them, were used. Today the game is supplied by a variety of manufacturers, including William Lindop Ltd. The name is derived from a verbal cricket appeal regarding whether a batsman is out.

The game

The game is usually played between two players, but can be played alone. It is played with two six-sided long dice and a paper scorecard. One die, the batting die, is labelled 1,2,3,4, 'owzthat' and 6. The second die, the umpire die, is labelled 'bowled', 'stumped', 'caught', 'not out', 'no ball', and 'L.B.W.'.

Before commencing, the form of 'cricket match' to be played is agreed e.g. test cricket, limited overs cricket, etc.. An appropriate cricket scorecard is then drawn up and the teams are written in. A toss of a coin decides which team chooses to bat first.

The batting side starts the game by rolling the batting die. Any runs signalled are recorded on the scorecard. When a 'owzthat' appeal is signalled, the umpire die is rolled for a decision. The batsman has a 1/3 chance of being not out, if the 'Not Out' or 'No Ball' is signalled. As in real cricket a 'No Ball' entitles the batsman to an additional strike (roll) and an extra run. A batsman is out if 'bowled', 'stumped', 'caught', or 'L.B.W.’ are signalled, and the next batsman comes to the crease. Depending on the cricket format the batting side is dismissed when all the batsmen are out or and if the over limit is reached. The other side then bats in an attempt to score more runs and hence win.

See also
 Dice variants

References

Dice games